is a Japanese football player for V-Varen Nagasaki.

Club statistics
Updated to 23 February 2016.

References

External links

Profile at V-Varen Nagasaki

1991 births
Living people
Hosei University alumni
Association football people from Kumamoto Prefecture
Japanese footballers
J1 League players
J2 League players
Ventforet Kofu players
V-Varen Nagasaki players
Association football forwards
Expatriate footballers in Cambodia
Universiade bronze medalists for Japan
Universiade medalists in football
Medalists at the 2013 Summer Universiade
Japanese expatriate sportspeople in Cambodia